Ruslan Barburoș (15 November 1978 – 29 January 2017) was a Moldovan footballer who played as a forward. He was the coach of the futsal and beach football club CS Joker-Tornado Chișinău, and coach of the Moldova national beach football team.

He played 3 matches for the national football team in 2001 and scored one goal.

Honours

Individual
Sheriff Tiraspol
Divizia Națională Top scorer (2): 2000–01 (17 goals; shared with David Mudjiri), 2001–02 (17 goals)

International goals

References

External links

Profile at 11v11.com
About Ruslan Barburoș on fcdacia.md

1978 births
2017 deaths
Moldovan footballers
Moldova international footballers
FC Sheriff Tiraspol players
FC Tiraspol players
FC Costuleni players
Association football forwards